División de Informaciones is a defunct Argentine intelligence agency created by Juan Perón to work within the National Presidential Office.

Its director was Rodolfo Freude. It collaborated in the smuggling of Nazi war criminals to Argentina in what became known as ODESSA.

See also
Secretariat of Intelligence
National Intelligence System
National Intelligence School
Directorate of Judicial Surveillance
National Directorate of Criminal Intelligence
National Directorate of Strategic Military Intelligence

Defunct Argentine intelligence agencies